Tennis events were contested at the 1991 Summer Universiade in Sheffield, United Kingdom.

Medal summary

Medal table

See also
 Tennis at the Summer Universiade

External links
World University Games Tennis on HickokSports.com

1991
Universiade
1991 Summer Universiade